Střelice may refer to places in the Czech Republic:

 Střelice (Brno-Country District), village and municipality
 Střelice (Plzeň-South District), village and municipality
 Střelice (Znojmo District), village and municipality
 , neighbourhood of town Uničov